Avalum Penn Thaane is a 1974 Indian Tamil-language film written and directed by Durai in his directorial debut. The film stars Sumithra, R. Muthuraman and M. R. R. Vasu. It received critical acclaim and became a commercial success.

Plot

Cast 
 Sumithra as Sita
 R. Muthuraman as Muthu
 M. R. R. Vasu as Seetha's pimp
 S. V. Sahasranamam as Uma's father
 Pandari Bai as Muthu's mother
 Thengai Srinivasan
 V. K. Ramasamy
 K. R. Indira Devi as Ruku
 Manorama
 S. V. Ramadas
 M. N. Rajam as Subbu
 Mynavathi
 Rama Prabha as Uma
 Ganthimathi as Ponnamma

Production 
Avalum Penn Thaane is the directorial debut of Durai who also wrote the screenplay. It was produced by Pandari Bai, under the banner Sri Panduranga Productions. She also acted in the film as the mother of R. Muthuraman's character. Sumithra made her acting debut in this film, portraying a prostitute. The film had cinematography by Manohar, and it was edited by M. Umanath. Shooting took place at Vikram and Vasu Studios. The inspiration for the concept came when Durai who during his days as an assistant director was in a shoot at Mysore where he witnessed a group of prostitutes looking at the crew scouting for a chance to which Durai felt sympathy for them and this formed a basis for Avalum Penn Thaane. Despite Durai wanting to end the film in a light manner, distributors were adamant that by having the conclusion of a girl starting a new life afresh after marriage would be rejected by audience so Durai unwillingly ended the film in a tragic manner.

Music 
The music was composed by V. Kumar, and the lyrics were written by Vaali. The playback singers were S. P. Balasubrahmanyam, P. Susheela and K. Jamuna Rani. There were only two songs in the film.

Reception 
Avalum Penn Thaane was a critical and commercial success. Kanthan of Kalki praised the performances of Muthuraman, Sumithra, M. R. R. Vasu and noted that hundred marks should be given to the dialogues written by Durai, he called the film as daringly fabricated picture and concluded that this A certified film is given A one certificate by fans due to the support of acting and direction.

References

External links 
 

1970s Tamil-language films
1974 directorial debut films
1974 films
Films about prostitution in India
Films about women in India
Films directed by Durai
Films scored by V. Kumar